Giungano is a town and comune in the province of Salerno in the Campania region of south-western Italy.

Geography
The municipality is located in northern Cilento and borders with Capaccio, Cicerale and Trentinara. It is not too far from the town of Agropoli and to the ancient Greek site of Paestum.

See also
Cilentan dialect
Cilento and Vallo di Diano National Park

References

External links

Cities and towns in Campania
Localities of Cilento